Elder Pharmaceuticals Ltd is a pharmaceutical company headquartered in Mumbai, Maharashtra. Its main activities include the manufacturing and marketing of prescription pharmaceutical brands, surgical and medical devices. Its largest presence in three therapeutic segments, Women's Healthcare, Wound Care and Nutraceuticals. It has 6 manufacturing plants in India & 1 in Nepal. It manufacture various dosage forms like tablets, capsules, syrups, injectables, topical creams and ointments.

History
In 1989, Jagdish Saxena formed Elder Pharmaceuticals in Mumbai. The first manufacturing plant was set up in 1989 at Nerul. It was listed on Bombay Stock Exchange and National Stock Exchange in 2000. It was founded by Saxena, when he lost his job due to the shut down of the pharma division of a company for which he was working.

On 13 Dec 2013 Torrent Pharmaceuticals Ltd has signed a definitive deal to acquire the branded domestic formulations business in India and Nepal of Elder Pharmaceuticals Ltd for Rs 20 billion.

Even after his death in 2013, The name of Jagdish Saxena and Elder is still considered highly prestigious. Saxena is considered as one of the visionary Pharmaceutical leaders of India.

In October 2017, the MD Alok Saxena died at the age of 52. 
The rerise of Elder is now resting on the shoulders Jagdish Saxena's second son Anuj Saxena, who is yesteryear a TV actor and daughter Shalini Saxena Kumar, who is an entrepreneur.

References

External links
Elder Pharma, Shahnaz Husain ink pact to launch 4 skin care product in 2006-07
Elder Pharma forays into NRT segment
Elder Pharmaceuticals sets up Elvista - A division dedicated to tap rural markets
Elder Pharma gets Japanese approval for API facility
[http://economictimes.indiatimes.com/elder-pharmaceuticals-ltd/infocompanyhistory/companyid-3801.cms Company History - Elder Pharma

Pharmaceutical companies of India
Pharmaceutical companies established in 1989
Manufacturing companies based in Mumbai
1989 establishments in Maharashtra
Indian companies established in 1989
Companies listed on the National Stock Exchange of India
Companies listed on the Bombay Stock Exchange